Bjarne Odd Weider (1913—1985) was the Bishop of the Diocese of Sør-Hålogaland from 1969 until 1982.

Weider was born on 17 June 1913 in Trondheim, Norway.  He received his Cand.theol. degree in 1936 from the MF Norwegian School of Theology in Oslo.  For several years he worked for the Norwegian Missionary Society.  He was a parish priest in Hurdal from 1955 until 1961.  He was the rector at the MF Norwegian School of Theology from 1961 until 1969.  In 1969 he was appointed bishop of the Diocese of Sør-Hålogaland.  He held that post until his retirement in 1982.

His son is the priest Bjarne Olaf Weider.

Works
Weider has written several books including:
Søndagens evangelium, 1979
Fortolkning av Tessalonikerbrevene, 1978
Kallet og tjenesten, 1969
Troens ja, 1966
I den Høyestes tjeneste, 1956

References

1913 births
1985 deaths
Bishops of Sør-Hålogaland
20th-century Lutheran bishops